Scott James may refer to:

 Scotty James (born 1994), Australian snowboarder
 Scott James (writer) (born 1962), American journalist and author
 Scott James, ring name of American professional wrestler Scott Armstrong (born 1961)